Carnarvoncochlea is a genus of small freshwater snails, aquatic gastropod mollusks in the family Tateidae.

Species
 Carnarvoncochlea carnarvonensis (Ponder & Clark, 1990)
 Carnarvoncochlea exigua (Ponder & Clark, 1990)

References

External links
 Ponder W., Zhang W.-H. (Wei-Hong), Hallan A. & Shea M. (2019). New taxa of Tateidae (Caenogastropoda, Truncatelloidea) from springs associated with the Great Artesian Basin and Einasleigh Uplands, Queensland, with the description of two related taxa from eastern coastal drainages. Zootaxa. 4583(1): 1-67

Tateidae